Hòa Hưng is the name of several settlements in Vietnam
 Hòa Hưng, Tiền Giang, a commune and village in Cái Bè District, Tiền Giang Province
 Hòa Hưng, Kiên Giang, a commune and village in Giồng Riềng District, Kiên Giang Province
 Hòa Hưng, Bà Rịa–Vũng Tàu, a commune and village in Xuyên Mộc District, Bà Rịa–Vũng Tàu Province